Verne Clark Lewellen (September 29, 1901 – April 16, 1980) was an American football player and executive.

Early life
Verne Lewellen was born on September 29, 1901 in Garland, Nebraska. A four-sport high school athlete at Lincoln High School in Lincoln, Nebraska. Lewellen attended Nebraska University, where he captained and quarterbacked the Cornhuskers to a 14-7 defeat of a Notre Dame squad in 1923. Also a pitcher, the Pittsburgh Pirates were ready to sign him until an injury from a train wreck affected his pitching arm.

Professional career

Player
Jim Crowley - who played against Lewellen in the 1923 Nebraska-Notre Dame matchup - recommended Lewellen to Green Bay Packers coach Curly Lambeau. Lewellen signed with the team and played most of his nine-year career with the Packers. Lewellen played in 102 games for the Packers from 1924 to 1932 (in 1927, the team "lent" him to the New York Yankees for three end-of-season games) and earned all-league first-team honors from 1926–29.

Executive
In 1950, he joined the Packers as a member of the executive committee, served as the Packers' general manager from 1954 through 1958 and business manager from 1961 to 1967.

Legal career
Completing a law degree from Nebraska University during his professional football career, he ran successfully for Brown County (WI) District Attorney in 1928 against Packer teammate LaVern Dilweg and was re-elected in 1930. He lost the seat in the 1932 election and practiced law until his retirement.

Personal life
Lewellen died on April 16, 1980 at the age of 78.

Legacy
He was elected to the Wisconsin Athletic Hall of Fame in 1967 and the Green Bay Packers Hall of Fame in 1970. The Professional Football Researchers Association named Lewellen to the PFRA Hall of Very Good Class of 2009.

References

External links

1901 births
1980 deaths
American football fullbacks
American football halfbacks
American football quarterbacks
Green Bay Packers general managers
Green Bay Packers players
Nebraska Cornhuskers baseball players
Nebraska Cornhuskers football players
National Football League general managers
Players of American football from Nebraska
Sportspeople from Lincoln, Nebraska